John Gordon (27 September 1858 – 3 December 1937) was an Australian politician.

Gordon was born in Wallan to farmer Neil Gordon and Margaret McKay. He grew up around Balmattan, Benalla and Euroa, and became a general storekeeper around 1878 at Nagambie. He also acquired land in the area and grazed sheep and shorthorn cattle.

Gordon served on Goulburn Valley Shire Council from 1896 to 1926 and was thrice president (1899–1900, 1908–09, 1917–18). In 1911 he won a by-election for the Victorian Legislative Assembly seat of Waranga. A Liberal and then a Nationalist, he served as a minister without portfolio from 1923 to 1924 and as Minister of Agriculture and Water Supply from March to July 1924.

Gordon retired in 1929, and died at Nagambie in 1937.

References

1858 births
1937 deaths
Nationalist Party of Australia members of the Parliament of Victoria
Members of the Victorian Legislative Assembly
Victorian Ministers for Agriculture